The space marine, an archetype of  military science fiction, is a kind of soldier who operates in outer space or on alien worlds. Historical marines fulfill multiple roles: ship defence, boarding actions, landing parties, and general-purpose high-mobility land deployments that operate within a fixed distance of shore or ship. By analogy, hypothetical space marines would defend allied spaceships, board enemy ships, land on planets and moons, and satisfy rapid-deployment needs throughout space.

History
The earliest known use of the term "space marine" was by Bob Olsen in his short story "Captain Brink of the Space Marines" (Amazing Stories, Volume 7, Number 8, November 1932), a light-hearted work whose title is a play on the song "Captain Jinks of the Horse Marines", and in which the protagonists were marines of the "Earth Republic Space Navy" on mission to rescue celebrity twins from aliens on Titan. Olsen published a novella sequel four years later, "The Space Marines and the Slavers" (Amazing Stories, Volume 10, Number 13, December 1936), featuring the same characters using a spaceship with active camouflage to free hostages from Martian space pirates on Ganymede.

A more widely known early example was E. E. Smith's Lensman series. While the first story, Triplanetary and most later sequels (Second Stage Lensmen, Children of the Lens and The Vortex Blaster) do not mention them, passing mentions of marines are made in Galactic Patrol (Astounding Stories, September 1937–February 1938) and Gray Lensman (Astounding Stories, October 1939–January 1940), and a more direct mention is made in First Lensman (1950): "Dronvire of Rigel Four in the lead, closely followed by Costigan, Northrop, Kinnison the Younger, and a platoon of armed and armored Space Marines!".

The phrase "space marines" appears in Robert A. Heinlein's "Misfit" (1939) and is again used in "The Long Watch" (1949) which expands on a story from his earlier novel Space Cadet (1948), in all cases before Smith had used the phrase. Heinlein's Starship Troopers (1959) is considered the defining work for the concept, although it does not use the term "space marine". The actors playing the Colonial Marines in Aliens (1986) were required to read Starship Troopers as part of their training prior to filming. Heinlein intended for the capsule troopers of the Mobile Infantry to be an amalgam of the shipborne aspect of the US Marine Corps relocated to space and coupled with the battlefield delivery and mission profile of US Army paratroopers.

As a gaming concept, space marines play a major role in the Warhammer 40,000 miniatures wargame, in which they are genetically altered super-soldiers and the most powerful fighting forces available to the Imperium of Man.  In computer games, playing a space marine in action games was popularized by id Software's Doom series, first published in 1993. It is a convenient game back-story as it excuses the presence of the character on a hostile alien world with little support and heavy weaponry. Some critics have suggested it has been overused to the point of being an action game cliché.

Trademark controversy
In December 2012, online retailer Amazon.com removed the e-book Spots the Space Marine by M.C.A. Hogarth at the request of games company Games Workshop. They claimed the use of the phrase "space marine" infringed on their trademark of the term for their game Warhammer 40,000. In February 2013, the row received a lot of publicity, with authors such as Cory Doctorow, Charles Stross and John Scalzi supporting Hogarth, and Amazon.com then restored the e-book for sale.

Characteristics
In film and television space marines often appear in squads, while in video games the protagonist Marine is usually alone or in very small squads. Depending on the mission, they may be deployed via dropship or another specialised insertion craft. Their battledress varies between media, ranging from equipment comparable to modern-day fatigues (or just being contemporary, such as the equipment of Colonial Marines in the re-imagined Battlestar Galactica) to environmentally sealed suits of powered armour. Equipment and weaponry is similarly varied, often incorporating various fictional technologies. Directed-energy weapons are common, though conventional firearms are also used, like the M41A Pulse Rifles the Colonial Marines in the Aliens movie use (which are projectile weapons that use an electric pulse to shoot caseless ammunition). If the marines' armour is particularly bulky, their weapons may be similarly scaled up such as in Warhammer 40,000 where Space Marines carry "boltguns," effectively rocket-propelled grenade launchers, as a standard firearm.

Non-fiction aspects
The United States Air Force's Project Hot Eagle considers the use of spacecraft to deliver Marines to a target on the ground. "Within minutes of bursting into the atmosphere beyond the speed of sound – and dispatching that ominous sonic boom – a small squad of Marines could be on the ground and ready for action within 2 hours."

Appearances in fiction

Books and short stories

Films and television

Games

The term is also used in an intentionally hyperbolic manner to describe especially powerful armies in Paradox Interactive strategy games Europa Universalis IV and Hearts of Iron IV.

See also
 Marines
 Space force
 Supersoldier

Notes

References

 
Marine
Stock characters